Golden Balls is a video game by Endemol UK based upon the UK TV series of the same name hosted by Jasper Carrott. The game was released on November 14, 2008. PEGI have rated the game as 3+. It was developed by British studio Slam Productions.

Gameplay

The gameplay is identical to the show Golden Balls, containing four rounds, the only exception being when the votes are cast in rounds 1 and 2, there is never a draw.

External links
http://www.mindscape.co.uk/Home/Home.asp

2008 video games
Nintendo DS games
Wii games
Video games based on game shows
Video games developed in the United Kingdom
Europe-exclusive video games
Mindscape games